Chorley is a market town in the borough of Chorley, Lancashire, England.  The town itself is unparished, and this list contains the listed buildings in the unparished area.  Outside the town are parished areas, and each of these has a separate list for its listed buildings.  The unparished area contains 53 buildings that are recorded in the National Heritage List for England as designated listed buildings.   Of these, one is listed at Grade I, the highest of the three grades, five are at Grade II*, the middle grade, and the others are at Grade II, the lowest grade.

The major building in the town is Astley Hall; this and structures associated with it are listed.  Before the arrival of industry in the 19th century, much of the area was rural, and a number of the listed buildings are, or originated as, farmhouses or farm buildings.  Industry itself has resulted in only two listed buildings, a surviving cotton mill chimney, and loomshops in the basements of a row of houses.  The Leeds and Liverpool Canal and the former Bolton and Preston Railway pass through the town, and there are listed structures associated with both of these,  The other listed buildings include churches, chapels and houses, and structures associated with them, and public houses.

Key

Buildings

References

Citations

Sources

Lists of listed buildings in Lancashire